Jack Fraser may refer to:
Jack Fraser (ice hockey, born 1882) (1882–1942)
 Charles Fraser (ice hockey) (1897–1970)

See also
John Fraser (disambiguation)